Tren del Norte may refer to:

Real Estelí FC, Nicaraguan football club nicknamed Tren del Norte
Tren del Norte, a baseball team in the Nicaraguan Professional Baseball League